Lawrence Alan Hough (born April 4, 1944) is a retired American rower. He competed in coxless pairs at the 1968 and 1972 Olympics and won a silver medal in 1968.

After graduating from Stanford University in 1966, Hough teamed with Tony Johnson. In 1967 they won the U.S., North American, Pan American, and European championships. Next year they won the national title and placed second at the 1968 Olympics. In 1969 they won another European title.

At the 1972 Olympics Johnson served as a coach, while Hough rowed with Dick Lyon; they placed ninth.

References 

1944 births
Living people
Rowers at the 1968 Summer Olympics
Rowers at the 1972 Summer Olympics
Olympic silver medalists for the United States in rowing
Sportspeople from Janesville, Wisconsin
American male rowers
Medalists at the 1968 Summer Olympics
Pan American Games medalists in rowing
Pan American Games gold medalists for the United States
Rowers at the 1967 Pan American Games
European Rowing Championships medalists
Medalists at the 1967 Pan American Games